Television broadcasting started around the 1950s and has continued to grow and become more sophisticated. When the National Basketball Association broadcasts first aired, they were broken down into four categories including; pre game, halftime, post game, and game coverage. Pregame casting usually covered a summary of predictions, key factors, and injuries. Halftime covered what happened in the first half, and the post game covered the game as a whole and the outcome. The game broadcast was a live game announcing that gave a play by play.

Local

See also
List of current National Basketball Association broadcasters
Owned-and-operated television stations in the United States

1ABC owned television station.

2CBS owned television station.

3Fox owned television station.

4NBC owned television station.

5Superstation (bold indicates former superstation).

Former teams

National

International

North America

Caribbean & Central America

South America

África

Europe

Asia & Oceania

See also
Historical Major League Baseball over-the-air television broadcasters
Historical NHL over-the-air television broadcasters
List of American Basketball Association broadcasters

References

External links
NBA TEAMS OVER THE AIR STATIONS

 
Over-the-air television broadcasters
NBA over-the-air television broadcasters
Local sports television programming in the United States